Ivanovo State Polytechnic University (ISPU) is a technical university in Ivanovo, Russia.

ISPU was established in 2012 by merging Ivanovo State University of Architecture and Civil Engineering and Ivanovo State Textile Academy.

ISPU  has over 3,000 students from 21 regions of the Russian Federation and 17 foreign countries.  The teaching staff is formed by more than 250 scientific and pedagogical workers, over 85% of them having scientific degrees of Candidates or Doctors of sciences.

Educational programs 
Higher educational   programs – bachelor  or specialist  programs:

Postgraduate programs for training scientific and pedagogical staff

Training in professions and specialties of secondary vocational education

Dissertation councils 
Candidate's (PhD) and doctoral dissertations are defended in two specialized thesis boards (The thesis defense board on construction sciences occupies the sixth position out of 46 in rating of the thesis boards of the Russian Federation for 2016).

Research activity 

The scientific research of the university is carried out within the framework of 19 main research areas corresponding to the prioritized scientific tendencies of development, technology and engineering in the Russian Federation.

The basis of the scientific, innovation and production infrastructure of  ISPU:
Five research and educational centers established in partnership with manufacturing companies and the Institute of Solution Chemistry of the Russian Academy of Sciences;
three small innovative enterprises; 
dozens of scientific laboratories; 
own publishing house and a section of instant printing; 
a complex of museum, exhibition and resource centers.

Engineering center of textile and light industry (IC TLI) 

IC TLI was established in 2014 as a result of the corporate reconstruction of the Department of Innovation activities of ISPU. In the same year, the IC TLI became the winner of the public competition of the Ministry of Education and Science and the Ministry of Industry and Trade of the Russian Federation for granting state support to pilot projects for the creation and development of engineering centers on the basis of educational institutions of higher vocational level.

University infrastructure 
The structure of the ISPU includes:
five educational buildings; 
two campus hostels; 
library, the book fund of which has more than 1 million book units;
sports facilities complex; 
recreation center in the town of Plyos.

Campus 
The distribution of places in dormitories is carried out by the departments of the university. The starting date of the settlement is annually approved by the order of the university's rector.

Nonresident students have primary right for settlement in the dormitories.

Scientific conferences 
The international scientific and practical forum SMARTEX has been held since 1998 in cooperation with the Institute of Solution Chemistry of the Russian Academy of Sciences.  In 2017 it became part of unified congress and exhibition events of the Russian Union of Textile and Light Industry Entrepreneurs (SOYUZLEGPROM).

Within the Regional Festival "Young Science contribution to the Development of the Ivanovo Region", ISPU holds an interregional (with international participation) youth scientific and technical conference "Young Scientists contribution to the Development of the National Engineering Initiative" ("SEARCH") and interregional scientific and practical seminar "Genesis of Economic and social problems of economic entities in Russia". The annual international scientific and technical conference "Information environment of the university" is devoted to the issues of introduction of information technologies in the educational and industrial spheres.

Recreation center 
The country recreation center is located in Plyos.  It has a one two-storey residential building, kitchen, sanitary-utility unit, and green area. There is equipment for table tennis, billiards, sports equipment rentals and a library.

Library 
The library provides information support of science and education and promotion of the spiritual, educational and cultural development of the individual. The library serves more than 12 thousand users; about 70 thousand bibliographic units consulted are registered annually. Currently more than 1 million book units are kept in the library.

International linguistic education center 
The International Linguistic Education Center is engaged in the training of international students, as well as in linguistic support for the process of teaching Russian as a foreign language.

Informatization of university activities 
Resource opportunities of informatization are provided by more than 1000 PCs, united in a single corporate network and provided with access to the Internet, a computer class complex and workstation.

Art

Theatre-studio of model art

The Theatre-studio of model art trains young men and women aged 15 to 25 years. Training takes place in the following disciplines: defile technique, plastic movements, acting skills, photo position, make-up technique and much more.

Upon completion of training, a certificate of additional education is issued.

The dance team "Universe City"

The dance team "Universe City" was set up in 2015 on the basis of ISPU with the support of the Students'Trade Union Organization.

References

External links 

http://ivgpu.com- Official site of the Ivanovo State Polytechnic University
YouTube
VK - 
Driving school

2012 establishments in Russia
Universities in Ivanovo Oblast
Public universities and colleges in Russia
Educational institutions established in 2012
Ivanovo
Technical universities and colleges in Russia